Theoretical Biology Forum (known as Rivista di Biologia-Biology Forum before 2012) is an annual scientific journal covering theoretical biology. According to the Journal Citation Reports, the journal has a 2016 impact factor of 0.421. The journal’s founder was Prof Osvaldo Polimanti who was a physician and
physiologist and was elected to the Faculty of Physiology at the University of Perugia in
December 1913. In 1914 he founded the Institute of Physiology and in 1919, he founded
Rivista di Biologia.   Previous editors for the journal have included Giuseppe Sermonti and Silvano Traverso.

Theoretical Biology Forum Journal aims to cover the broad field of theoretical biology. In particular, the problems of evolutionary theory are discussed and the possibility of relative mathematical modelling is examined. Historical, philosophical and other chemical and physical subjects linked to biology are also accepted.   The current editor in chief is Professor David Lambert of Griffith University Department of Evolution.

Members of the editorial board have included Paolo Freguglia, Lev Beloussov, Eva Jablonka, Marcello Buiatti and Peter Saunders.

References

Mathematical and theoretical biology journals
Publications established in 1919
Annual journals
English-language journals